Take My Life is a 1947 British crime film directed by Ronald Neame and starring Hugh Williams, Greta Gynt and Marius Goring. It was adapted from Winston Graham's 1947 novel of the same name.

It was shot at Pinewood Studios and on location at York railway station. The film's sets were designed by the art directors John Bryan and Wilfred Shingleton

Plot
Nicholas "Nicky" Talbot attends the London debut of his wife, opera singer Philippa Shelley, at Covent Garden. After her successful performance, Nicky runs into former girlfriend Elizabeth Rusman backstage, a musician in the orchestra, who asks for his help. She gives him her address (and keeps his personalised pencil) before Philippa appears. At home, Nicky and a jealous Philippa quarrel over Elizabeth. When Philippa throws an object that strikes her husband in the forehead, he leaves in a huff.

The scene then shifts to a courtroom, where the prosecuting counsel reveals that Nicky is on trial for the strangulation of Elizabeth that night. A flashback shows the murderer setting fire to the body. When the killer leaves the flat, he conceals his face from a man using a handkerchief pressed to his forehead, leading the police to assume he has been injured there. Also, the pencil is found at the scene of the crime. The police take Nicky into custody.

Philippa goes to see Elizabeth's mother in Holland, then to an employment agency and Elizabeth's acquaintances, without any progress. Inspector Archer does, however, let her examine the dead woman's possessions and copy a bit of music. When Philippa plays it at home, she discovers that her nephew is already familiar with it.

She sets out for a school in Scotland, having ascertained that one of the masters may be the composer. Mr. Fleming, the headmaster, is disturbed to recognise her from her photograph in the newspaper. He takes her on a tour of the school. She notices that the school group photograph for the previous year is missing. When she plays the tune on the chapel organ, she sees in a mirror that he is perturbed. Philippa obtains a copy of the photograph the next morning and sees Elizabeth in it. Fleming becomes aware of this and follows her aboard the train. He confronts her in her compartment. They are interrupted when a man enters, but when the newcomer reveals that he is deaf, Fleming confesses to the crime, though it was unpremeditated. Elizabeth had threatened to divorce him for cruelty, which would have ruined him. After the deaf man leaves, Fleming destroys the incriminating photograph and tries to throw Philippa from the train. The deaf man returns just in time. Fleming then jumps to his death.

When Philippa goes to see Inspector Archer (still without proof), he introduces her to Detective Sergeant Hawkins, the "deaf" man who is not deaf at all and therefore heard Fleming's confession.

Cast
 Hugh Williams as Nicholas Talbot 
 Greta Gynt as Philippa Shelley 
 Marius Goring as Sidney Fleming
 Francis L. Sullivan as Prosecuting Counsel 
 Henry Edwards as Inspector Archer
 Rosalie Crutchley as Elizabeth Rusman 
 Marjorie Mars as Mrs. Newcombe
 David Wallbridge as Leslie Newcombe 
 Herbert C. Walton as Mike Grieve
 Ronald Adam as Detective Sergeant Hawkins
 Maurice Denham as Defence Counsel
 Eleanor Summerfield as Miss Carteret
 Gerald Campion as Newspaper Seller (uncredited) 
 Leo Bieber as Parone
 Nelly Arno as Mrs Rusman

References

External links

1947 films
1940s crime thriller films
British crime thriller films
British courtroom films
Films directed by Ronald Neame
Films produced by Anthony Havelock-Allan
Films set in London
Films shot at Pinewood Studios
Films scored by William Alwyn
Films based on British novels
Films about opera
British black-and-white films
1947 directorial debut films
1940s British films
1940s English-language films